Andrea Roche is an Irish entrepreneur . Andrea launched Irelands first blogger/ influencer management agency and represents most of Irelands well known Influencers.She had a successful career as one of Irish best known and most photographed models for a  number of years before opening the Andrea Roche Modelling Agency. Andrea is a socialite, and is a regular television personality. She took part in the RTÉ One reality sports television series Celebrity Bainisteoir in 2009 and featured on a weekly basis on the TV3 show Ireland AM. Andrea retired full-time from modelling in 2008, she has been credited with discovering models such as Roz Purcell, Clara McSweeney, Pippa O’Connor Ormond and Miss World 2003 Rosanna Davison.

Career
Roche began her career as a model and as Miss Ireland, Andrea competed in the 1998 Miss Universe pageant (top 10 semi-finalist).  Roche is beauty editor with VIP and fashion editor of South East Wedding magazine and  appears on TV3's Ireland AM as their fashion expert. Roche reduced her modelling to dedicate more time to the Miss Universe Ireland pageant.

Roche took part in the second series of the RTÉ One reality sports television series Celebrity Bainisteoir in 2009. She was described as being "among the less likely contestants" to take part, even confessing in the first episode that she had very little knowledge of the Gaelic Athletic Association–"I barely know the format of a game". However, to learn more, she read Kean to Succeed, A Trip Into the World of GAA by Gerald Kean, the celebrity solicitor who participated in the first series. She expressed her dislike of wearing "mucky wellies" and having to do without cosmetics during training and got through it by shouting "Go on lads!" repeatedly. Roche managed Rockwell Rovers GAA from County Tipperary. Her team played in the second quarter-final of the series against St Michael's GAA of County Roscommon, who were managed by John Waters. Roche and Waters were seen training with GAA All Stars winners Tony McManus and Declan Browne.

She has been described as "a great beauty" by veteran broadcaster Derek Davis, who has since died, and as both "a recession-busting beauty" and "Ireland's greatest beauty" by the Irish Independent.

In October 2010 Andrea launched the Andrea Roche modelling Agency in Dublin, representing many high-profile models in Ireland, including some who have gone on to model internationally.

Awards
Roche won the VIP Most Stylish Woman award at the VIP Style Awards in 2008.

Personal life
Roche was raised in Clonmel Co. Tipperary. She sat her Leaving Certificate at Rockwell College after attending the Loreto Secondary School. Roche moved to Carlow to do Business Studies at the Regional Technical College, then moved to Dublin to pursue modelling.

In 2006 Andrea Roche married PJ Mansfield Junior who has been linked to organised crime. They separated in 2010.

In December 2011, Roche got engaged to businessman Rob White at the Eiffel Tower in Paris. They married in Ibiza in 2012 surrounded by friends and family.  In September 2013 it was announced that Andrea was expecting her first child.
 Andrea gave birth a daughter, Sophie in March 2014.

References

1977 births
Irish female models
Living people
Miss Ireland winners
Miss Universe 1998 contestants
People from County Tipperary
Virgin Media Television (Ireland) presenters
Miss World 1997 delegates
Beauty pageant contestants from Ireland